Millennium Institute may refer to:

 Millennium Institute (Hungarian Think Tank), a culturally oriented policy-advising group
 Instituto Millenium, a Brazilian think tank
 Millennium Institute (Auckland), where Peter Winter was Head Coach of Athletics
 Millennium Institute (Washington), headed by Hans Rudolf Herren
 Institutes established under the Millennium Science Initiative in Brazil, Chile, and Uruguay